Contagious is a 1997 American television film directed by Joe Napolitano and starring Lindsay Wagner as a doctor trying to prevent a cholera epidemic following an outbreak.

Plot 
A plane where shrimp tainted with cholera was served, arrives from South America to Los Angeles. Soon after, the first patient dies from the disease. Because this person was a cocaine dealer, there is some suspicion that the drug is somehow related to the disease. Therefore, a narcotics detective (Elizabeth Peña) is put on the case, while in the hospital an experienced doctor (Lindsay Wagner) tries to prevent the outbreak from turning into an epidemic.

Cast
Lindsay Wagner as Dr. Hannah Cole
Elizabeth Peña as Detective Luisa Rojas
Ken Pogue as George Ryburn
Brendan Fletcher as Brian
Tom Wopat as Sam
Alexandra Purvis as Julie
Matt Hill as Carl Freedman
Gerard Plunkett as Sklar
Jon Cuthbert as Vic
Bill Croft as Gerard
Jed Rees as Doug Lamoreaux
Karen Elizabeth Austin as Norma Meyers
P. Lynn Johnson as Jamie West
David Lovgren as Tom Carlen

External links

1997 television films
1997 films
American thriller television films
Films about viral outbreaks
Films shot in Vancouver
1990s English-language films
1990s American films